Cosita rica is a Venezuelan telenovela written by Leonardo Padrón and produced by Venevisión between 2003 and 2004.

Fabiola Colmenares and Rafael Novoa starred as the main protagonists, while Chiquinquirá Delgado, Carlos Cruz and Nohely Arteaga starred as the antagonists.

History
On September 30, 2003, Venevisión started airing Cosita rica at 9:00 pm. The last episode was aired on August 30, 2004, with Sabor a ti replacing it.

During its broadcast, the telenovela became a hit among viewers due to its combination of humor, romance and drama with political and socio-cultural commentary. At the time the telenovela was on air, Venezuela was going through a presidential recall referendum, and the media was heavily polarized. The character of Olegario Pérez was seen as an alter-ego of then president Hugo Chávez, and events in the telenovela mirrored what was happening in the country.

After the end of the broadcast of Cosita rica, the Venezuelan government created the Law on Social Responsibility on Radio and Television which aimed as censuring writers and television content produced in the country. This affected subsequent telenovelas produced by RCTV (which was shutdown in 2007 by the government of Chávez for its anti-government stand) and Venevisión, as writers became restrictive in terms of what content they could write and produce.

Plot 
Paula, the most popular girl of the neighborhood, dreams of becoming a dancer. The day she meets Diego Luján, the young heir of a cosmetic holding, she can't stop thinking of him. Diego is about to get married with the famous model Vicky Cárdenas. But destiny is going to play its cards and the sudden encounter between Paula and Diego turns into a love story.

Paula and Diego meet again and during the week they spend together, their lives change forever. Diego promises Paula to cancel his engagement to Vicky and they both agree to meet at the airport to start a new life.

When Paula arrives at the airport, she sees how an old and weak man can't manage the luggage he carries, so Paula decides to help him. When they are about to cross the immigration line, the authorities discover drugs inside the old man's luggage that Paula is holding, but the man has disappeared and Paula is sent to jail for five years. Paula cannot get in touch with Diego to explain him the situation. Diego looks for her with any success.

Today, five years later, Paula leaves jail. She wants to recover her life and to revenge the man who destroyed her future. She starts working as makeup girl. One day, she is hired to make up a bride. This is the day when she reencounters Diego, who is going to get married. The impact is mutual. But there's nothing to do. It's too late.

The day of the wedding, Diego's father dies unexpectedly and the worst comes when he finds out that he is not the heir. Olegario Pérez, the bastard son of Diego's father, will manage the holding. From one day to another, Olegario Pérez will become one of the most powerful executives of the country. The worst comes when Olegario meets Paula by chance and he falls in love with her. Olegario asks Diego to help him conquer a woman. Without knowing that the woman is Paula, Diego helps his stepbrother writing love letters, choosing the flowers, the restaurants and the presents for him. Paula starts falling in love with him and she accepts to get marry to Olegario. A duel begins for the love of Paula between the two brothers.

Cast

Main 
 Fabiola Colmenares as  Paula Chacón / Paula C
 Rafael Novoa as Diego Luján
 Chiquinquirá Delgado as Victoria "Vicky" Cárdenas
 Gledys Ibarra as Patria Mía
 Carlos Cruz as Olegario Pérez
 Marialejandra Martín as Lara de Santana
 Aroldo Betancourt as Vicente Santana
 Elba Escobar as Concordia Pérez
 Nohely Arteaga as Tiffany Crúz
 Daniel Alvarado as Lisandro Fonseca
 Marisa Román as Verónica Lujan / María Suspiro
 Édgar Ramírez as Cacique Chacón
 Tania Sarabia as Mamasanta
 Carlos Villamizar as Placido Chacón
 Lourdes Valera as La Chata
 Roberto Lamarca as Diómedes Crespo
 Beatriz Valdés as Prodigio Vargas
 Ricardo Bianchi as Rodolfo Lima
 Juan Carlos Vivas as Rosendo
 Franklin Virgüez as Nicomedes Luján

Recurring 
 Marina Baura as Tentación Luján
 Yanis Chimaras as Juancho
 Beba Rojas as Panchita
 Ana Karina Manco as Camila
 Guillermo Dávila as Gastón
 Josué Villae as Guillermo

References

External links

2003 telenovelas
2003 Venezuelan television series debuts
2004 Venezuelan television series endings
Venevisión telenovelas
Venezuelan telenovelas
Spanish-language telenovelas
Television shows set in Venezuela